Lawrence William Shepard (April 3, 1919April 5, 2011) was an American professional baseball player, manager, and pitching coach. Although he was born in Lakewood, Ohio (USA), Shepard lived with his family after the age of 14 in Montréal, Québec (Canada), where he attended McGill University.

During his playing days, Shepard was a right-handed pitcher who played minor league baseball from 1941 through 1956, with time out for United States Army service during World War II. He became a playing manager in the Brooklyn Dodgers' farm system in 1948, with the Medford Nuggets of the Class D Far West League. His club finished second, thanks to the 22–3 record of its star pitcher – Shepard himself. He then moved up to the Billings Mustangs of the Class C Pioneer League, where, as a pitcher, he won 21, 22 and 24 games in successive (1949–51) seasons. As a skipper, his 1949 club won the league playoffs.

In 1952 and part of 1953, Shepard took a break from managing, becoming strictly a relief pitcher for the Hollywood Stars of the Pacific Coast League. Concurrently, he left the Dodger system for the Pirates' organization. He resumed his managerial career in the middle of the 1953 season in the Pittsburgh system, winning the 1956 and 1957 Western League championships with the Lincoln Chiefs. From 1958 through 1966, he managed at the Triple-A level for Pittsburgh with the Salt Lake City Bees and Columbus Jets, notching three first-place finishes.

In 1967, Shepard reached the Major League level when he was named pitching coach of the Philadelphia Phillies. After only one season, he was appointed manager of the Pirates. In his two seasons as skipper of the Bucs, Pittsburgh finished sixth in the ten-team National League in 1968 (with a record of 80–82) and fourth in the NL East at 84–73 in 1969 (when Shepard was released, that September 25). During his two seasons at the helm, he managed the legendary Roberto Clemente; Clemente batted .291 and .336, respectively, under Shepard.

After his firing by the Pirates, Shepard returned to the coaching ranks. He was the pitching coach of the fabled Cincinnati Reds "Big Red Machine" dynasty under Sparky Anderson from 1970 through 1978, with the Reds winning four National League pennants, two World Series championships, and five NL West titles over that nine-year stretch. He finished his coaching career with the San Francisco Giants in 1979, then scouted for the Giants.

Shepard died in Lincoln, Nebraska, at age 92 in 2011.

References

External links

Larry Shepard at SABR (Baseball BioProject)

1919 births
2011 deaths
American expatriate baseball people in Canada
Baseball players from Ohio
Billings Mustangs managers
Billings Mustangs players
Charleston Rebels players
Cincinnati Reds coaches
Hollywood Stars players
Lincoln Chiefs players
Major League Baseball pitching coaches
McGill University alumni
Medford Nuggets players
Nashua Dodgers players
Philadelphia Phillies coaches
Pittsburgh Pirates managers
Pueblo Dodgers players
Salt Lake City Bees players
San Francisco Giants coaches
San Francisco Giants scouts
Sportspeople from Cuyahoga County, Ohio
Sportspeople from Lakewood, Ohio
Sportspeople from Lincoln, Nebraska
Baseball players from Montreal
Trois-Rivières Renards players
United States Army personnel of World War II
Williamsport Grays players